"George (Disco Tango)" is a song, originally released in English in 1977 by German female singer Pat Simon (born 1949) after a 5-year break in her career.

In the same year it was recorded in French (under the title "Georges") by Sylvie Vartan. Her version was included on her 1977 album Georges and was also released as a single in the same year.

Background and writing 
The original song was written by Thomas Strasser, Pat Simon and Colin Hall.

The Sylvie Vartan recording  was produced by Jacques Revaux.

Commercial performance 
The Sylvie Vartan version reached at least the top 10 in France (according to the chart, courtesy of RTL Hit Parade, published in the "Hits of the World" section of the 21 January 1978 issue of U.S. Billboard).

Track listings

Pat Simon version 
7" single "George (Disco Tango) Part I + II" (1977, Germany, UK, Italy, France, Netherlands, etc.)
 A. "George (Disco Tango) Part I" (3:18)
 B. "George (Disco Tango) Part II" (3:08)

Sylvie Vartan version (in French) 
7" single PB 8140 (France, Belgium, Portugal, etc.)
A. "Georges" ("Georges Disco Tango") (3:25)
 written by C. Hall, M. Mallory, P. Simon, P. Billon, T. Strasser
B. "Arrete de rire" ("Sail On") (4:00)
 written by J.M. Rivat, H. Warren

References

External links 
 Sylvie Vartan — "Georges" (single) at Discogs
 Pat Simon — "George (Disco Tango)" Part I + II at Discogs

1977 songs
1977 singles
French songs
Sylvie Vartan songs
RCA Victor singles
Songs written by Michel Mallory